Dhaka Cantonment is a cantonment located in the northern part of Dhaka, Bangladesh. The headquarters of the Bangladesh Army, and Air Force are situated within the cantonment which combined form the Armed Forces of Bangladesh. The Cantonment is located on the north-east end of the Dhaka metropolis.

Installations 
 6th Independent Air defense Artillery Brigade
 Armed Forces Division (AFD)
 Army Headquarters (AHQ)
 Defence services Command & Staff College (DSCSC)
 Air Headquarters (Air HQ)
 Old Airport
 14th Independent Engineer Brigade
 86th Independent Signal Brigade
 Army Security Unit (ASU)
 BAF Base Bangabondhu
 BAF Base Bashar
 BNS Haji Mohosin
 Cantonment Board, Dhaka
 Combined Military Hospital, Dhaka
 Department of Military Lands & Cantonments
 Directorate General of Forces Intelligence (DGFI) Headquarters
 DGFI Dhaka Detachment
 46th Independent Infantry Brigade
 16th Bangladesh Infantry Regiment
 57th East Bengal Regiment
 Headquarters Logistics Area
 24th Engineer Construction Brigade
 Independent President's Guards Regiment
 Adhoc Army Aviation Group
 Station Headquarters,Dhaka Cantt
 Central Ordnance Depot
 Central Mechanical Transport Depot
 Army Military Police Unit
 57th Engineer Company
 12th Engineer Battalion
 Army Static Signal Battalion
 Inter Services Selection Board (ISSB)
 Inter Services Public Relations Directorate (ISPR)
 Dhaka Cantonment Central Mosque
 Dhaka Cantonment railway station
 Army Multipurpose Complex
 Directorate General of Medical Service (DGMS)
 Siraj-Khaleda Memorial Cantonment Board General Hospital
 Armed Forces Institute of Pathology
 Prime Minister's Office, Armed Forces Division (AFD)
 Bangladesh Army Welfare Trust Head office
 Sena Malancha Convention Hall
 Bangladesh Diesel Plant Head office
 Sena Bhaban
Areas under the Defense Officers Housing Schemes (DOHS) also fall under the Dhaka Cantonment Area.

Organisations 
 Sena Paribar Kalyan Samity
 Kurmitola General Hospital
 Combined Military Hospital
 Sainik Club
 Senakunjo
 Army Golf Club
 Kurmitola Golf Club
 Bangladesh Army Stadium
 Inter-Services Public Relation
 Directorate General of Forces Intelligence
 Dhaka Cantonment Bangabandhu Museum
 BMTF Corporate office

Education 
 Armed Forces Medical College (AFMC)
 Adamjee Cantonment College
 BAF Shaheen College, Dhaka
 BAF Shaheen College, Kurmitola
 BAF Shaheen English Medium College
 Bangladesh Navy College (B. N. College)
 Shaheed Bir Uttam Lt. Anwar Girls' College
 Shaheed Bir Bikrom Ramiz Uddin Cantonment School, Dhaka
 Adamjee Cantonment Public School
 Muslim Modern Academy (MMA)
 Uttar Kafrul High School
 Uttar Kafrul Primary School
 Adarsha Bidya Niketon, Manikdee
 Balughat High School
 Bangladesh International School and College
 Dhaka Cantonment Girls Public School and College
 Shaheed Ramiz Uddin Cantonment College
 Nirjhor Cantonment Public School & College
 Rainbow Kindergarten
 Prottoy Inclusive English Medium School

See also 
 Jolshiri Abashon

References

Cantonments of Bangladesh